A humanitarian corridor is a type of temporary demilitarized zone intended to allow the safe transit of humanitarian aid in, and/or refugees out of a crisis region.  Such a corridor can also be associated with a no-fly zone or no-drive zone. 

Various types of "humanitarian corridors" have been proposed in the Post–Cold War era, put forward either by one or more of the warring parties, or by the international community in the case of a humanitarian intervention. Humanitarian corridors were used frequently during the Syrian Civil War.

United Nations Safe Areas

United Nations Safe Areas (UN Safe Areas) were humanitarian corridors established in 1993 in the territory of Bosnia and Herzegovina during the Bosnian War by several resolutions of the United Nations Security Council.

List of proposed humanitarian corridors
Siege of Mariupol March 2022, shut down twice by attacks
United Nations Safe Areas
Lachin corridor
Battle of Grozny (1999–2000)#Siege
Cyclone Nargis#Activists respond to the blockade of aid
Humanitarian impact of the Russo-Georgian War
2008 Nord-Kivu campaign#Humanitarian aid corridor
Gaza War (2008–2009)#Humanitarian ceasefires
First Libyan Civil War#Humanitarian situation
Safe Zone (Syria)
Timeline of the 2022 Russian invasion of Ukraine: phase 1#3 March

References

Further reading

Blockades
Humanitarian military operations
Peace mechanisms
Political geography